Spock's Beard is an American progressive rock band formed in Los Angeles.

The band was formed in 1992 by brothers Neal (lead vocals, keyboards, guitar) and Alan Morse (guitars, backing vocals), John Ballard (bass) and Nick D'Virgilio (drums). Ballard was replaced by Dave Meros before the release of their debut album, The Light (1995), and Ryo Okumoto (keyboards) joined soon after. Neal Morse left the band following the release of their sixth album, Snow (2002), and D'Virgilio took over as the band's frontman. In 2011, D'Virgilio also left and was replaced by Jimmy Keegan (drums) and Ted Leonard (lead vocals) from Brief Nocturnes and Dreamless Sleep (2013) onwards. To date, the band have released thirteen studio albums, and numerous live releases.

The band, particularly the Neal Morse line-up, are considered to be at the forefront of modern progressive rock music.  Four of their first six albums featured in the Prog Report's "Top 50 Prog Albums 1990–2015", with The Light and Snow featuring in the top ten.

History

Neal Morse era (1992–2002)
Spock's Beard was formed in Los Angeles in 1992 by brothers Neal and Alan Morse. Both had played together in bands in the 1980s and initially intended that their new project would be just the two of them, with Neal Morse performing lead vocals and keyboards and Alan Morse on guitar. The brothers soon decided to form a full band and recruited Nick D'Virgilio on drums after meeting him at a blues jam in Los Angeles. John Ballard, a friend of Neal Morse's, was brought in to play bass, but was replaced by Dave Meros before the band began recording demos for their first album. The band's name is a reference to the 1967 "Mirror, Mirror" episode of Star Trek. According to Alan Morse:

The band's debut album, The Light was recorded independently throughout 1994 and released later that year. While Neal Morse had performed the keyboard parts on the album, Ryo Okumoto was hired to fill in for live performances. One of their first major live appearances was at the Los Angeles Progfest in 1995, where they were introduced to Thomas Waber. Waber, a founding member of Giant Electric Pea and InsideOut Records, signed the band to Giant Electric Pea and licensed The Light for release in Europe.

Nick D'Virgilio era (2002–2011)
Immediately following the release of Snow, Neal Morse announced that he was leaving Spock's Beard. Having recently converted to Christianity, Morse wanted to explore that aspect of his life more through his music, but did not want to impose his beliefs upon the band. He urged them to continue on without him and Nick D'Virgilio took over as the band's lead singer. D'Virgilio would continue to play drums on studio albums, while Jimmy Keegan was hired to fill in for him as drummer during live performances.

On July 8, 2003 the band released its first album without Neal Morse, Feel Euphoria. Without their principal songwriter, the band adopted a more collaborative approach, as well as enlisting the help of John Boegehold and Stan Ausmus with songwriting, both of whom would go on to contribute to all of the band's subsequent albums. The result was a musical departure from the band's previous albums, with a conscious shift towards a more modern sound, and was met with a mixed response from fans. On February 1, 2005 the band released their eighth album, Octane which received a generally more positive reception from fans. Several concerts from the Octane tour were recorded and the highlights released as Gluttons for Punishment, the band's first live album since the departure of Neal Morse.

On May 21, 2006, Dave Meros confirmed that the band had begun working on their ninth studio album. The album, titled Spock's Beard, was released on November 21, 2006 to a mixed reaction from fans. The band continued to tour sporadically over the next few years, with a 2007 show in the Netherlands released as a live album. On July 23, 2009, the band announced that had begun work on their tenth album, to be released independently rather than through a record label. The production costs were covered by pre-orders through the band's website. The album, X, was released as a limited edition for those who had pre-ordered in May 2010. A standard edition was released at the end of August 2010 through Mascot Records, four years after the release of Spock's Beard, the longest gap the band has had between albums. Mascot Records also released a live album, The X Tour Live, recorded at the only US show in support of the X album.

Ted Leonard era (2011–present)
Spock's Beard played the Sweden Rock Festival in June and the High Voltage Festival in July 2011. On both occasions Enchant singer Ted Leonard filled in for Nick D'Virgilio, who was unavailable to perform. The High Voltage performance featured an appearance by Neal Morse, who reunited with the band for the end of "The Light" and "June", and was later released as a live album. On November 18, 2011, D'Virgilio announced his departure from the band, citing personal reasons and other commitments. Two days later it was announced on the band's official website that Leonard and touring drummer Jimmy Keegan would be the new singer and drummer of the band, respectively.

On April 2, 2013 the band released Brief Nocturnes and Dreamless Sleep, their first studio album with Leonard and Keegan as official members . The recording and mastering of the album was funded using the crowdsourcing site Indiegogo and featured song-writing contributions from Neal Morse. On April 22, 2015 the band announced that their twelfth album would be The Oblivion Particle, and would be released later that year. The album was released on August 21, 2015. Later that year the band released The First Twenty Years, a compilation album spanning the band's entire career. The compilation also included a new song written by Neal Morse, "Falling For Forever", which featured every member of the band to have appeared on previous recordings.

In July 2016 the current line-up of the band reunited with D'Virgilio and Neal Morse for shows at Morsefest in Cross Plains, Tennessee and at the Night of the Prog festival in Lorelei, Germany to perform Snow in its entirety.  On October 12, 2016 Keegan announced that he was leaving the band for personal reasons. D'Virgilio filled in on drums and backing vocals for their performance on Cruise to the Edge 2017. On March 25, 2017 it was confirmed that D'Virgilio had agreed to play on their upcoming thirteenth album, with recording expected to begin in May of that year  On February 28, 2018 Dave Meros announced that the new album would be titled Noise Floor, and would be released May 25, 2018. The announcement also included the album's track listing and the confirmation of D'Virgilio's involvement in the recording of the album.  On June 13, the band announced a tour in support of the album, with former Saga drummer Mike Thorne as a touring drummer.

In 2018, a spinoff of Spock's Beard, Pattern-Seeking Animals, was formed by Ted Leonard, Dave Meros, Jimmy Keegan, and John Boegehold. As of 2022, they have released three studio albums.

Musical style
Spock's Beard plays a brand of progressive rock with pop music leanings, drawing much influence from Yes, Genesis and Gentle Giant. The band is known for their intricate, multi-part vocal harmonies and use of counterpoint vocals.

Members
Current members
 Alan Morse – guitars, backing vocals (1992–present)
 Dave Meros – bass, backing vocals (1993–present), keyboards (2011–present)
 Ryo Okumoto – keyboards, backing vocals (1995–present)
 Ted Leonard – lead vocals, guitar (2011–present)

Collaborators
 John Boegehold – song co-writer (2003–present)
 Stan Ausmus – song co-writer (2003–present)
 Mike Thorne – drums, percussion (live member: 2018–present)

Former members
 John Ballard – bass (1992–93)
 Neal Morse – lead vocals, keyboards, guitar, synths (1992–2002; guest: 2008, 2011, 2014)
 Nick D'Virgilio – drums, percussion (official member: 1992–2011, live and studio member: 2017–2018), backing vocals (1992–2002, 2017–2018), lead vocals, guitar, keyboards (2002–2011)
 Jimmy Keegan – drums, percussion, backing vocals (2011–2016; live member: 2002–2011)

Timeline

Discography

 The Light (1995)
 Beware of Darkness (1996)
 The Kindness of Strangers (1998)
 Day for Night (1999)
 V (2000)
 Snow (2002)
 Feel Euphoria (2003)
 Octane (2005)
 Spock's Beard (2006)
 X (2010)
 Brief Nocturnes and Dreamless Sleep (2013)
 The Oblivion Particle (2015)
 Noise Floor (2018)

References

External links
 Spock's Beard official site
 Ryo Okumoto official site
 Neal Morse official site

 

American progressive metal musical groups
Musical groups from Los Angeles
Musical groups established in 1992
Progressive rock musical groups from California
Inside Out Music artists